Scheepvaartmuseum may refer to:
 Nederlands Scheepvaartmuseum in Amsterdam, The Netherlands

 Fries Scheepvaart Museum in Sneek, The Netherlands

 MAS Nationaal Scheepvaartmuseum